The Liga Portuguesa de Basquetebol, also known as Liga Betclic for sponsorship reasons, is the top men's professional club basketball league in Portugal.

History
From the 2008–09 season onward, the competition has been again organised by the Federação Portuguesa de Basquetebol (Portuguese Basketball Federation) after not having been for 13 seasons. This was caused by the fold of the LPB after many years of financial problems, with the league now being a semi-professional league.

Between the 1965–66 and 1973–74 seasons, the league champions were determined by a tournament between the winners of the Campeonato Metropolitano (representing Portugal) and the champions of the then Portuguese colonies Mozambique and Angola, as a similar fashion to the Portuguese Roller Hockey First Division, which was also played during those seasons. However, the first of these tournaments never came to be because of a protest launched by Mozambican team Sporting de Lourenço Marques.

Teams

Portuguese champions
Source

Campeonato Metropolitano champions

1965–66: Benfica
1966–67: Académica de Coimbra
1967–68: Ass. Desp. do Banco Pinto de Magalhães
1968–69: Sporting CP
1969–70: Benfica (2)
1970–71: Benfica (3)
1971–72: Porto
1972–73: Benfica (4)
1973–74: Benfica (5)

Liga de Clubes de Basquetebol champions

Liga Portuguesa de Basquetebol champions

Performance by club

Records
Benfica became the second team in basketball history to achieve a perfect regular season (100% wins) in the 2008–09 season, after Maccabi Tel Aviv in the 1970s.

References

External links
  
 Eurobasket.com league page

   
1
Basketball leagues in Europe
Professional sports leagues in Portugal